The Tabor tree frog (Hyloscirtus lascinius) is a species of frog in the family Hylidae found in Colombia and Venezuela. Its natural habitats are subtropical or tropical moist montane forests, rivers, rural gardens, and heavily degraded former forests.

References

Hyloscirtus
Amphibians of Colombia
Amphibians of Venezuela
Amphibians described in 1969
Taxonomy articles created by Polbot